This  list of generic names of political parties includes only generic party names, not overviews of parties, e.g., liberal and green parties.

Action Party
National Action Party
People's Action Party
Agrarian Party
Alliance Party
National Alliance
New Alliance Party
American Party
Blue Party
Centre Party
Christian Party
Christian Democratic Party and Christian Democratic Union
Christian People's Party
Civic Party
Civic Democratic Party
Colorado Party
Communist Party and Communist League
International Communist League
Revolutionary Communist League
Worker-Communist Party
Revolutionary Communist Party
Conservative Party
Conservative People's Party
Constitution Party
Democratic Party and Democratic Alliance
Christian Democratic Party and Christian Democratic Union
Civic Democratic Party
Union of Democratic Forces
Free Democratic Party
Democratic Labour Party
Liberal Democratic Party
National Democratic Party and National Democratic Congress
New Democratic Party
Democratic People's Party
Progressive Democratic Party
Radical Democratic Party
Social Democratic Party
Social Democratic Union
Democratic Socialist Party
United Democratic Party
Equality Party
Fascist Party
Fatherland Party and Fatherland Union
Union of Democratic Forces
Free Democratic Party
Freedom Party
Green Party
Independence Party
International
Industrial Workers of the World
Justice Party
Labour Party
 Labour Party (disambiguation)
Socialist Labour Party
Left Party
United Left
Liberal Party
Liberal Democratic Party
National Liberal Party
Radical Liberal Party
Social Liberal Party
Libertarian Party
Moderate Party
Motherland Party
National Party, National Front and National Congress
National Alliance
National Democratic Party and National Democratic Congress
National Liberal Party
New National Party
National Socialist Party
National Unity Party
New Party
New Alliance Party
New Democratic Party
New National Party
People's Party and People's Alliance
Christian People's Party
Conservative People's Party
Democratic People's Party
Liberal People's Party
National People's Party
Republican People's Party
Popular Party and Popular Alliance
National Popular Party
Pirate Party
Progressive Party
Progressive Democratic Party
Radical Party
Radical Democratic Party
Left Radical Party
Red Party
Reform Party
Liberal Reform Party
National Reform Party
Republican Party
National Republican Party
Revolutionary Party
Revolutionary Communist Party
Social Democratic Party
Social Democratic Union
Socialist Party
Democratic Socialist Party
Socialist Labour Party
National Socialist Party
Socialist Workers Party
Unionist Party
Unity Party, United Party
United Left
National Unity Party
United Democratic Party
United Workers' Party
Workers' Party
Socialist Workers' Party
United Workers' Party
Worker-Communist Party
Workers' League

General